Bruno Delbonnel, (born 1957) is a French cinematographer. He worked on the films Amélie (2001), A Very Long Engagement (2004), Harry Potter and the Half-Blood Prince (2009), Inside Llewyn Davis (2013) and Darkest Hour (2017), and has appeared in Wes Anderson's The French Dispatch (2021) as Tip-Top.

Delbonnel's accolades include a César Award and a European Film Award, as well as six Academy Award nominations and four BAFTA Award nominations.

Life and career
Delbonnel was born in Nancy, Meurthe-et-Moselle, France and graduated in 1978 from the ESEC (Paris, Île-de-France).

He has collaborated twice with fellow French director Jean-Pierre Jeunet for Amélie and A Very Long Engagement.

He then started collaborating with many other directors, such as Tim Burton, the Coen brothers and Joe Wright.

Delbonnel has been nominated for the Academy Award for Best Cinematography six times, for the films Amélie (2001), A Very Long Engagement (2004), Harry Potter and the Half-Blood Prince (2009), Inside Llewyn Davis (2013), Darkest Hour (2017), and The Tragedy of Macbeth (2021).

He was appointed in 2019 at the head of the cinematography department of the Paris film school, La Fémis.

Style
His work tends to feature very stylized color palettes, often very warm and featuring yellows and greens as prominent and ubiquitous colors which often tint the whole image. Also often in his work, the film stock used has a very apparent, well-defined grain structure.

Filmography

As cinematographer
Film

Television

As director/screenwriter

Awards and nominations

Academy Awards

BAFTA Awards

American Society of Cinematographers

César Awards

Satellite Awards

European Film Award

Other Awards

References

External links

1957 births
Living people
European Film Award for Best Cinematographer winners
French cinematographers
French film directors
French male screenwriters
French screenwriters
Mass media people from Nancy, France